Punch Records is a Birmingham-based music and arts agency that operates through four central pillars: Creating, Touring, Programming, and Educating. They offer award-winning tours, festivals, international projects, and innovative educational and outreach programs for young people.

History
Punch Records was founded in the Perry Barr area of Birmingham in 1997 by Ammo Talwar. The organization began as an urban music record store, and a place where underground DJs from the West Midlands could demonstrate and grow their mixing and rapping abilities.

Punch began to host development events for young people to develop Punch's famed outreach programme, used by local schools. From this, Birmingham City Council became involved and now regularly programme events through Punch which have included a roadshow in Centenary Square during Birmingham's European Capital of Culture 2008 bid.

In 2002, the success of the record shop led Ammo to relocate to Birmingham's Creative Quarter, the Custard Factory complex in Digbeth where the company now runs rhythm, song writing, music production, poetry, lyrics, dance, street art, photography and percussion lessons for the local community, schools and youth centers.

In 2003, Punch produced a film called Preskool, highlighting and promoting Birmingham's black music scene.

Punch now collaborates with companies such as Artfest, the BBC, BMG, OOM Gallery, Sony, Urban Music Seminar and Warners.

Ammo Talwar was appointed a Member of the Order of the British Empire (MBE) in the 2008 New Year Honours for his contribution to music and young people in the West Midlands.

References

External links
 

Companies based in Birmingham, West Midlands
Music in Birmingham, West Midlands